Vellore Arulmigu Ratnagiri Balamurugan temple is a temple dedicated to the god Murugan (Kartikeya), in Thirumanikundram, Vellore, India. It was constructed around the 14th century, and was mentioned by the 14th century poet Arunagirinathar. It is situated on the top of a hill, in accordance with ancient Hindu scriptures which say that where there is a hill, there is Murugan.

Devotees believe that the Murugan idol in the shrine and the guru Swami Balamurugan Adimai (born 1941) are manifestations of the deity.

Days of importance in the calendar year
Tamil New Year Day
Ādi Krittikai celebrations (Lord Murugan's Birthday)
Ādi Velli (auspicious Friday in the month of August or September)
Kanda Shashti celebrations (Six Days)
Navaratri (Nine Nights of the Goddess Festival)
Panguni Uttiram
January 1
The anniversary of Swamiji Balamurugan Adimai's enlightenment - 20 March

References

Hindu temples in Vellore district
Murugan temples in Tamil Nadu